Spurstow is a civil parish in Cheshire East, England.  It contains 17 buildings that are recorded in the National Heritage List for England as designated listed buildings.  Of these, one is listed at Grade II*, the middle grade, and the others are at Grade II.  The parish is mainly rural, and the listed buildings include houses, cottages, farmhouses, farm buildings, a smithy, and a school.

Key

Buildings

See also

Listed buildings in Bunbury
Listed buildings in Haughton
Listed buildings in Brindley
Listed buildings in Ridley
Listed buildings in Peckforton
Listed buildings in Beeston

References
Citations

Sources

 

Listed buildings in the Borough of Cheshire East
Lists of listed buildings in Cheshire